Seeley is a variation of the Anglo-Norman Sealy surname. Notable people with the surname include:

 Alastair Seeley (born 1979), motorcycle racer, currently competing in the British Superbike Championship
 Blossom Seeley (1891–1974), American Vaudeville performer, teamed with Benny Fields
 Bob Seeley (born 1928), American boogie woogie pianist
 Colin Seeley (1936–2020), former motorcycle sidecar racer and motorcycle manufacturer
 Daniel Seeley (born 1984) English Footballer Ipswich Town fc and Cambridge United 
D. J. Seeley (born 1989), basketball player for Bayern Munich
 Drew Seeley (born 1982), a Canadian actor
 Elias P. Seeley (1791–1846), American Whig politician, 11th governor of New Jersey
 George Seeley (1877–1921), English footballer with Southampton and Queens Park Rangers
 Gerald Seeley (1903–1941), English cricketer
 Harry Seeley (1839–1909), British paleontologist
 Ken Seeley (born 1962), American television personality
 John Seeley (disambiguation), multiple people
 Mabel Seeley (1903–1991), American mystery book author
 Mildred Seeley (1918–2001), doll collector, doll-related entrepreneur and prolific author on the subjects of doll
 Richard Seeley (born 1979), Canadian ice hockey defenceman
 Robert Seeley (1602–1668), Puritan settler in Massachusetts Bay Colony
 Robert Thomas Seeley (1932–2016), American mathematician
 Stuart William Seeley (1901–1978), American electrical engineer
 Tim Seeley (fl. 2000s), American comic book artist
 Trish Seeley (born 1979), Funsized model
 Walter Seeley (1941–2019), American boxer
 William Henry Harrison Seeley (1840–1914), the first American citizen to be awarded the Victoria Cross